Queenstown is a town in Queen Anne's County, Maryland, United States. The population was 664 at the 2010 census.

Geography

Queenstown is located at  (38.989086, -76.156645).

History
Queenstown was the original seat of Queen Anne's County, before the location changed to Centreville, Maryland.  Its location was important during the 18th century, because it is near a creek that, during that time, could be navigated by tradesmen.  A hub for shipping and receiving, Queenstown was attacked by English troops in the War of 1812 on August 13, 1813.

Bloomingdale, Bowlingly, and St. Peter's Church are listed on the National Register of Historic Places.

Transportation
The primary present-day method of transportation to and from Queenstown is by road. The town is located adjacent to the junction of U.S. Route 301 and U.S. Route 50, which link the town to metropolitan Philadelphia, Washington D.C. and Ocean City. State highways also serving the town include Maryland Route 18, Maryland Route 456 and Maryland Route 656.

Demographics

2010 census
As of the census of 2010, there were 664 people, 271 households, and 185 families living in the town. The racial makeup of the town was 92.9% White, 3.2% African American, 0.2% Native American, 0.9% Asian, 0.5% Pacific Islander, 0.9% from other races, and 1.5% from two or more races. Hispanic or Latino of any race were 3.8% of the population.

There were 271 households, of which 32.8% had children under the age of 18 living with them, 50.9% were married couples living together, 14.0% had a female householder with no husband present, 3.3% had a male householder with no wife present, and 31.7% were non-families. 26.6% of all households were made up of individuals, and 10.4% had someone living alone who was 65 years of age or older. The average household size was 2.45 and the average family size was 2.92.

The median age in the town was 40.2 years. 25% of residents were under the age of 18; 4.9% were between the ages of 18 and 24; 27.9% were from 25 to 44; 27% were from 45 to 64; and 15.2% were 65 years of age or older. The gender makeup of the town was 48.5% male and 51.5% female.

2000 census
As of the census of 2000, there were 617 people, 255 households, and 184 families living in the town. The racial makeup of the town was 95.30% White, 3.73% African American, 0.16% Native American, 0.16% Asian, and 0.65% from two or more races. Hispanic or Latino of any race were 1.30% of the population.

There were 255 households, out of which 27.1% had children under the age of 18 living with them, 57.6% were married couples living together, 11.0% had a female householder with no husband present, and 27.8% were non-families. 22.0% of all households were made up of individuals, and 6.3% had someone living alone who was 65 years of age or older. The average household size was 2.42 and the average family size was 2.83.

In the town, the population was spread out, with 20.6% under the age of 18, 8.6% from 18 to 24, 28.7% from 25 to 44, 28.4% from 45 to 64, and 13.8% who were 65 years of age or older. The median age was 41 years. For every 100 females, there were 102.3 males. For every 100 females age 18 and over, there were 99.2 males.

The median income for a household in the town was $48,500, and the median income for a family was $49,500. Males had a median income of $37,321 versus $30,893 for females. The per capita income for the town was $24,185. About 3.9% of families and 3.7% of the population were below the poverty line, including 2.8% of those under age 18 and 13.4% of those age 65 or over.

Points of interest
Queenstown Premium Outlets is an outlet mall located on Routes 50 and 301 that hosts over 65 stores.

References

Towns in Maryland
Towns in Queen Anne's County, Maryland
Former county seats in Maryland
Maryland populated places on the Chesapeake Bay